This list of association football rivalries catalogues football rivalries around the world. This includes rivalries at the club and international level, including local derby and intercontinental competitions. It also lists rivalries between individual players, managers, and one another.

Individual rivalries

Between players

Between players and managers

Between managers

International
This list uses the geographic confederation classifications issues by International Association Football Federation (FIFA): CAF (Africa), AFC (Asia and Australia), UEFA (Europe), CONCACAF (North & Central America and the Caribbean), OFC (Oceania) and CONMEBOL (South America).

Intercontinental

Asia and Australia (AFC)

Africa (CAF)

Europe (UEFA)

North & Central America and the Caribbean (CONCACAF)

South America (CONMEBOL)

Oceania (OFC)

Club rivalries

Africa (CAF)

Asia (AFC)

Europe (UEFA)

North & Central America and the Caribbean (CONCACAF)

Oceania (OFC)

South America (CONMEBOL)

See also 
List of sports rivalries
List of association football competitions
List of association football club rivalries in Europe

References

External links 
 FootballDerbies.com
 FIFA.com
 EuroRivals.net – fixtures, results and videos of football derbies
 50 Greatest Rivalries in World Football – Bleacher Report
 Top 10 Greatest Rivalries Soccer Teams All Time - Listvia